The 1988–89 Belgian Hockey League season was the 69th season of the Belgian Hockey League, the top level of ice hockey in Belgium. Four teams participated in the league, and Olympia Heist op den Berg won the championship.

Regular season

External links
Season on hockeyarchives.info

Bel
Belgian Hockey League seasons
Bel